Tawaia is a genus of flowering plants belonging to the family Araceae.

Its native range is Borneo.

Species:

Tawaia sabahensis

References

Araceae
Araceae genera